An-Nisa' (The Women) is the fourth chapter (sūrah) of the Quran, with 176 verses (āyāt). The title derives from the numerous references to women throughout the chapter, including verse 34 and verses 127–130.

Summary

1 Man and his Creator
2 Orphans, the duty of guardians to such
3–5  Treat your wives and those your right hands possess fairly
6–13 The law of inheritance
14–15 The punishment of adulteresses
16–17 Repentance enjoined
18–19 Women's rights 
20–27  Forbidden and lawful degrees in marriage
28–30 Gaming, rapine, and suicide forbidden
31–33 Husband's superiority over woman recognised
34 Reconcilement of man and wife
35–36 Parents, orphans, the poor etc. to be kindly treated
37–41 Hypocrisy in almsgiving condemned
42 Prayer forbidden to the drunken and polluted
43–45 Jewish mockers denounced
46–53 Idolatry the unpardonable sin
54–55 The rewards of faith and unbelief
56 Trusts to be faithfully paid back
57–68 Disputes to be settled by God and his Apostle
69–74 Precautions etc., in warring for the faith
75–84 The disobedient and cowardly reproved
85 Salutations to be returned
86–90 Treatment of hypocrites and apostates
91–93 Believers not to be slain or plundered
94–99 Believers in heathen countries to fly to Muslim lands
100–102 Special order for prayer in time of war
103 Exhortation to zeal for Islam
104–114 Fraud denounced
115–125  Idolatry and Islam compared
126 Equity in dealing with women and orphans enjoined
127–129 men are protectors of women
130–132 God to be feared
133 Fraud denounced
134–138 Muslims exhorted to steadfastness
139–143 Hypocrites to be shunned
144–151 The reward of hypocrisy and belief compared
152–154 Presumptuous and disobedient Jews destroyed
155–158 The Jews defame Mary and Jesus
159-160 Certain kinds of food forbidden to Jews as punishment
161–168 Muhammad’s inspiration like that of other prophets
169–174 Christians reproved for their faith in Jesus as the Son of God and in the doctrine of the Trinity
175 The law of inheritance for distant relatives  

This Medinan surah aims at protecting the newly formed Muslim community by outlining acceptable behavior for Muslims. It illustrates the Quran's role as an authoritative legal source and its ability to shape the community. The surah aims to eradicate the earlier practices of pagan, Arab communities that are no longer considered moral in the Muslim society. For example, the section of this surah about dealing fairly with orphan girls (4:2–4) addresses the pre-Islamic Arabic practice of marrying orphan girls to take their property.

Shirk (refer 4:48 and 4:116) is held to be the worst form of disbelief, and it is identified in the Quran as the only sin that God will not pardon.

Thematically, "an-Nisā" not only addresses concerns about women, but also discusses inheritance, marriage laws, how to deal with children and orphans, legal practices, jihād, relations between Muslim communities and People of the Book, war, and the role of Jesus as a prophet, rather than the son of God as Christians claimed. Furthermore, in discussing war, this surah encourages the Muslim community to fight for the vulnerable in war, as demonstrated by 4:75: "Why should you not fight in God's cause and for those oppressed men, women, and children who cry out, ‘Lord, rescue us from this town whose people are oppressors! By Your grace, give us a protector and give us a helper!’?" The surah addresses a multitude of issues faced by the early Muslim community and responds to the challenges the community faced. The wide variety of issues addressed in the surah and the length of the surah make it difficult to divide into literary structures. However, based on a study of themes present in each section of the Surah, Amīn Ahsan Islāhī divides the surah into three thematically-based sections: social reform, the Islamic community and its opponents, and a conclusion. Mathias Zahniser presents an alternative means of looking at the structure of this surah. He claims that the central theme of this surah is the address to the Christians. He has come to this conclusion based on examination of the structure of the surah based on such devices as parallels, repetition, and ring composition. However, Carl Ernst admits that more works needs to be done in this type of structural analysis to more fully understand the composition of such extensive suras.

In Qur'an and Woman, Amina Wadud places interpretations of the Quran into three categories: traditional, reactive, and holistic. The type of interpretation one applies to surah 4 greatly influences one's perspective on the role of women within Muslim society. Taking the third approach, a holistic approach allows for a feminist reading of the Quran, which is particularly relevant to an-Nisā and can reshape the understanding of this surah.

Classification 
Regarding the timing and contextual background of the believed revelation (Asbāb al-nuzūl), it is a Medinan surah as confirmed by Muhammad Husayn Tabataba'i, who states that the sura must have been revealed after the hijrah based on the subject matter.

Although an-Nisā typically appears as the fourth surah, according to the Nöldeke classification of surahs, based on Islamic traditions, "The Women" was approximately revealed as the hundredth surah. Amir-Ali places it as the 94th surah, while Hz. Osman and Ibn`Abbas believe it is the 92nd. Imam Ja'far as-Sadiq places it as the 91st surah revealed. Based on the legislation concerning orphans, the surah was most likely revealed after many Muslims were killed at the Battle of Uhud, leaving numerous dependants in the new Muslim community. The revelation, therefore, began around the year three, according to the Islamic calendar, but was not completed until the year eight. Consequently, parts of this surah, the second-longest in the Quran,  were revealed concurrently with portions of "The Examined Woman," sura 60. However, the surah shows some thematic coherence, despite its disjointed and ongoing revelation.

Furthermore, as relates to the placement of this surah within the Quran as a whole, Neal Robinson notes what he refers to as the "dovetailing" of surahs. Based on this idea of structure, one surah ends with a topic that is immediately picked up in the next surah. The Family of 'Imran, surah 3, includes a discussion of male and female near the end of the surah (3.195). This theme continues at the beginning of surah 4: "People, be mindful of your Lord, who created you from a single soul, and from it created its mate, and from the pair of them spread countless men and women far and wide; be mindful of God, in whose name you make requests of one another." This dovetailing may indicate a complex editorial process involved in ordering the surahs.

Exegesis

3 Institutions of Marriage and Slavery

A detailed explanation of this verse is given in the 'interpretation' (Tafsir) of Ibn Kathir, a scholar of the Mamluk Sultanate\Mamluk era:

Al-Jalalayn, says:

15–16  Unlawful sexual intercourse

In verses 4:15–16 the first, preliminary directives for the punishment for unlawful sexual intercourse are stated. The first verse deals with women. The punishment laid down was to confine them until further directives were revealed. The second verse (i.e. 16) relates to both sexes. The injunction lays down that they should be punished – that is, they should be beaten and publicly reproached. Later, another injunction was revealed see (Surah An-Nour Verse 24:2) which laid down that both the male and female should be given a hundred lashes.

22–23 Incest

Verses 4:22- 23 cover which classes of women within one's family with whom marriage or sexual intercourse would be considered haram.

These relationships and limitations are defined and elaborated on within Tafsir al-Jalalayn.

34 Men are the protectors and maintainers of women 

 There are a number of interpretations of the original Arabic 4:34. 
The Encyclopedia of Islam and the Muslim World terms  Verse 4:34 the Quran's least egalitarian verse.

Some Muslims, such as Islamic feminist groups, argue that Muslim men use the text as an excuse for domestic violence.

48 Idolatry and polytheism 

Tafsir, Ibn Kathir says,  "Verily, Allah forgives not that partners should be set up with Him (in worship), meaning, He does not forgive a servant if he meets Him while he is associating partners with Him".   The Enlightening Commentary into the Light of the Holy Qur'an says, "Polytheism is the worst form of sins and it is a barrier against the Divine forgiveness."

59 Obedience Verse

65 Verse 
Muhammad al-Bukhari, Muslim ibn al-Hajjaj, Ibn Majah and Nasa'i narrated a hadith transmitted by Zubayr ibn al-Awwam, that believed by some scholars as the Asbab al-Nuzul (cause of revelation) of the  Sura of An Nisa verse 65. However, there are contemporary Fatwa that the revelation of this verse were attributed to az-Zubayr were weak, as the stronger Hadith which attributed to the revelation of this verse were instead attributed to the tradition of Umar, the second Rashidun Caliph

69 Martyrs, and the righteous
Muhammad ibn Sulayman recorded that al-Sadiq relayed to his elderly father, Abu Muhammad ibn Sulayman, concerning the following verse: "And whoever obeys Allah and the Messenger – those will be with the ones upon whom Allah has bestowed favor of the prophets, the steadfast affirmers of truth, the martyrs and the righteous. And excellent are those as companions." (4:69) stating, "The Messenger of Allah in this verse is from of the prophets, and we (Ahl al-Bayt) in this subject are the truthful and the martyrs and you all, (our followers),  are the righteous, so adopt this name."

74–76 Sword verses

According to Dipak Kutha, "much of the religious justification of violence against nonbelievers (Dar ul Kufr) by the promoters of jihad is based on the Quranic "sword verses" (traditionally Muslims speak of "the sword verse", singular, i.e.  ).
 contains passages that could be interpreted to endorse violence,

According to Ibn Kathir:

Tafsir Ibn Kathir says, "Therefore, the believers fight in obedience to Allah and to gain His pleasure, while the disbelievers fight in obedience to Shaytan. Allah then encourages the believers to fight His enemies". Islam allows war in self-defense (Quran 22:39), to defend Islam (rather than to spread it), to protect those who have been removed from their homes by force because they are Muslims (Quran 22:40), and to protect the innocent who are being oppressed (Quran 4:75).

"Some Muslim thinkers in the past and some radical Muslims today . . .  (say about Verse 4:76) . . . the so-called 'sword verses', have "abrogated" (revoked or annulled) the verses that permit warfare only in defense. They used these 'sword verses' to justify war against unbelievers as a tool of spreading Islam"."But the idea of a total and unrestricted conflict is completely unIslamic (as per other verses of the Quran)."

89–90  Kill them wherever you find them

Muhammad advises his companions to avoid taking these individuals as helpers or guardians. Al-Awfi reported from Ibn Abbas, if they abandon Hijrah, As-Suddi said that this part of the Ayah means, "If they make their disbelief public take (hold of) them and kill them wherever you find them, and take neither Awliya nor helpers from them". However, Ibn Kathir clarifies that non-combatants, those who are neutral or hesitant about fighting and those who offer you peace are not to be fought against.

116 Shirk

Tafsir Ibn Kathir says:  "Shirk shall not be forgiven, in reality the idolators worship shaytan".

127–130 Female orphans, desertion by husband, and desirability of marital peace
These verses cover issues associated with female orphans; desertion by the husband and the desirability of marital peace.

145 Hypocrites
In Kitab al-Kafi, Ja'far al-Sadiq writes a letter to his companions stressing the importance of obeying Allah, his Messenger, and the "Wali al Amr" (Progeny of Muhammad)- going so far as to say that those who disobey and deny their virtues are "liars and hypocrites". He asserts that these are the individuals described as "hypocrites" in the verse, "Indeed, the hypocrites will be in the lowest depths of the Fire – and never will you find for them a helper."

157  Islamic view on Jesus' death

An explanation of the Islamic view of Jesus as a prophet, rather than as the son of God as Christians claim, is given in Tafsir Ibn Kathir.

171 Islamic view of the Trinity

See also
 At-Talaq – divorce
 Islam and gender segregation
 Islamic feminism
 Islamic marital jurisprudence
 LGBT in Islam
 Lut
 Verse of Obedience
 Women in Islam

References

Sources

External links 
 
 "Qur'anic Verses (4: 94–100, 100–105)" is a digitized manuscript of an-Nisā, dating from the 12th century, from the World Digital Library
Quran 4 Clear Quran translation
Q4:126, 50+ translations, islamawakened.com

 
Nisa
Islam articles needing attention
Islam and women
Polygyny
Jesus in Islam
Sharia
Marriage in Islam
Jihad